Vexillum caffrum is a species of sea snail, a marine gastropod mollusk, in the family Costellariidae, the ribbed miters.

Description
The length of the shell varies between 35 mm and 51 mm.

The shell is dark chocolate, with two or three yellow zones, the upper one visible on the spire.

Distribution
Tropîcal Pacific Ocean from Indonesia to Polynesia; off Australia (Queensland)

References

 Swainson, W. 1822. A Catalogue of the Rare and Valuable Shells, which formed the Celebrated Collection of the late Mrs Bligh. With an appendix, containing descriptions of many new species. London : Publisher unknown 78 pp.
 Cotton, B.C. 1957. Family Mitridae. Royal Society of South Australia Malacological Section 12: 8 pp. 
 Cernohorsky, W.O. 1970. Systematics of the families Mitridae & Volutomitridae (Mollusca: Gastropoda). Bulletin of the Auckland Institute and Museum. Auckland, New Zealand 8: 1-190
 Hinton, A. 1972. Shells of New Guinea and the central Indo-Pacific. Milton : Jacaranda Press xviii 94 pp. 
 Wilson, B. (1994) Australian marine shells. Prosobranch gastropods. Vol. 2 Neogastropods. Odyssey Publishing, Kallaroo, Western Australia, 370 pp.

Externalk links
 Linnaeus, C. (1758). Systema Naturae per regna tria naturae, secundum classes, ordines, genera, species, cum characteribus, differentiis, synonymis, locis. Editio decima, reformata (10th revised edition), vol. 1: 824 pp. Laurentius Salvius: Holmiae.
 Quoy, J. R. C. & Gaimard, J. P. (1832-1835). Voyage de la corvette l'Astrolabe : exécuté par ordre du roi, pendant les années 1826-1827-1828-1829, sous le commandement de M. J. Dumont d'Urville. Zoologie. 1
  Cernohorsky, Walter Oliver. The Mitridae of Fiji; The veliger vol. 8 (1965)

caffrum
Gastropods described in 1758